The Falls of the Ohio National Wildlife Conservation Area is a national, bi-state area on the Ohio River near Louisville, Kentucky in the United States, administered by the U.S. Army Corps of Engineers. Federal status was awarded in 1981. The falls were designated a National Natural Landmark in 1966.

Overview

The area is located at the Falls of the Ohio, which was the only navigational barrier on the river in earlier times. The falls were a series of rapids formed by the relatively recent erosion of the Ohio River operating on 386-million-year-old Devonian hard limestone rock shelves. Louisville, Kentucky, and the associated Indiana communities—Jeffersonville, Clarksville, and New Albany—all owe their existence as communities to the falls, as the navigational obstacles the falls presented meant that late-18th-century and early- to late-19th-century river traffic could benefit from local expertise in navigating the  drop made by the river over a distance of two miles (3 km). In its original form, the falls could be characterized more as rapids extending over a length of the river, than as a point-like discontinuity in a river such as Niagara Falls. Still, the falls provided a singular, dramatic, and daunting obstacle to navigation on this important inland waterway.

The first locks on the river, the Louisville and Portland Canal completed in 1830, were built within a bypass canal constructed to provide year-round navigation of the river. The falls were later largely covered by the McAlpine Locks and Dam, built by the Army Corps of Engineers. The taming of the Ohio River at the falls, with the attendant reduction in local flow velocity, has of late led to the covering over of the fossil beds by large and increasing quantities of low-velocity effluvia: although an impediment to viewing the fossils, this action serves to protect the portions of the falls covered over by sediment and therefore temporarily immune to direct weathering. However, a significant area of the fossil-rich Devonian limestone rock is still left exposed, and is accessible to visitors today. The best time for visitation is during the low water season of the Ohio River between August and October. Removal of fossils is prohibited.

The shallowness of the falls provided a favored crossing point for bison in pre-settlement times and, later, an easy crossing for Native Americans.

In 1990, a section of the area in Indiana became the Falls of the Ohio State Park. An interpretive center is open throughout the year.

Size and sound
Prior to modification for industrial and navigational purposes, the Falls of the Ohio spanned the entire width of the Ohio River. Native Americans and early European explorers heard the crisp roar of the Ohio River crashing down the cascade falls more than 10 miles away.

Geology

The rock unit in which the falls are formed is referred to as the Jeffersonville limestone. The limestone formed approximately 387 to 380 million years ago during the Emsian Age (in the latest part of the Early Devonian Period) and the Eifelian Age (Middle Devonian). The exposure is unique—large and diverse tabulate corals and rugose corals are exposed in lifelike positions.  Brachiopods and bryozoans are also present, as are gastropods (snails).

During the Devonian Period, the region lay at the bottom of a shallow inland sea about ten degrees north of the equator in the supercontinent of Euramerica.

See also

 Geography of Louisville, Kentucky
 History of Louisville, Kentucky
 List of attractions and events in the Louisville metropolitan area

References

External links

 Falls of the Ohio State Park
 Falls of the Ohio Archaeological Society
 Falls of the Ohio (U.S. Army Corps of Engineers). Retrieved 29 April 2017
 
 
 
 Plat of the Falls of the Ohio at extreme low water (surveyed by Capt. T.J. Cram, Summer 1843)

 

Clarksville, Indiana
History of Louisville, Kentucky
Landforms of Louisville, Kentucky
Ohio River
Ohio
Tourist attractions in Louisville, Kentucky
Protected areas of Clark County, Indiana
Protected areas of Jefferson County, Kentucky
National Natural Landmarks in Indiana
National Natural Landmarks in Kentucky
Waterfalls of Indiana
1981 in paleontology
Protected areas established in 1981
1981 establishments in Kentucky
1981 establishments in Indiana